Gurraneachoel or Garranachole is a townland in Castletownroche, County Cork, Ireland. Its English translation means "the crossroads of music".

References

Townlands of County Cork